The 1996–97 Ukrainian Second League is the sixth season of 3rd level professional football in Ukraine. The competition commenced on 10 August 1996 and ended on 21 June 1997.

Teams

Promoted teams 
Six teams have been promoted from the 1995–96 Ukrainian Football Amateur League:
 Pokuttya Kolomyia - Group 1 winner (debut)
 Papirnyk Malyn - Group 3 winner (debut)
 Fakel Varva - Group 4 winner (debut)
 Lokomotyv Smila - Group 3 runner-up (debut)
 Avanhard Merefa - Group 4 third (debut)
 Portovyk Kerch - Group 6 winner (debut)

Two teams were added also without participation in the Ukrainian Football Amateur League:
 Nyva Bershad - undetermined (debut), supposedly instead of Sportinvest Kryvyi Rin (withdrew at the last season winter break, yet placed above the 18th position)
 FC Petrivtsi - undetermined (debut)

Relegated teams 
Two teams have been relegated from the 1995–96 Ukrainian First League:
 Ratusha Kamyanets-Podilskyi – 21st place (debut)
 Skala Stryi – 22nd place (debut)

Withdrawn teams 
 Ratusha Kamyanets-Podilskyi
 Skala Stryi
 Chayka Sevastopol
 Druzhba Berdiansk
 Dnistrovets Bilhorod-Dnistrovskyi
 Nyva-Kosmos Myronivka
 Avanhard Zhydachiv

Merged and renamed teams 
 Skhid Slavutch changed its name to Nerafa Slavutych.
 Khutrovyk Tysmenytsia changed its name to FC Tysmenytsia.
 Obolon Kyiv changed its name to Obolon-PPO Kyiv in cooperation with the Ukrainian Armed Forces (PPO is an abbreviation for Anti-Air Defense).
 During winter break, Avanhard Merefa moved to Kharkiv and changed its name to Avanhard-Metalist Kharkiv.

Location map

Group A

Final standings

Top goalscorers

Group B

Final standings

Top goalscorers

See also
 1996–97 Ukrainian Premier League
 1996–97 Ukrainian First League
 1996–97 Ukrainian Cup

References

External links
 Druha Liha Group A and Group B (ukr-football.org)
 Second League by Alexei Kobyzev
 Druha Liha Group A and Group B by Dmitriy Troshchiy
 1996-97 Ukrainian professional football at RSSSF

Ukrainian Second League seasons
3
Ukra